Ren is a village in Marz Rural District, Chah Dadkhoda District, Qaleh Ganj County, Kerman Province, Iran. In the 2006 census, it had a population of 96 people living in 16 households.

References 

Populated places in Qaleh Ganj County